Shishi is a county-level city under the administration of the prefecture-level city Quanzhou, in Fujian province, People's Republic of China.

It's well known for garments trading and industry.

The actress Yao Chen was born in Shishi City.

Administrative divisions
Subdistricts:
Hubin Subdistrict, Fengli Subdistrict

Towns:
Lingxiu, Baogai, Hanjiang, Yongning, Xiangzhi, Hongshan, Jinshang

References

 
County-level divisions of Fujian
Quanzhou